Metopia argyrocephala is a species of satellite flies in the family Sarcophagidae. It is unusual among kleptoparasitic flies in that the larvae develop in nests of both bees and wasps.

References

External links

 

Sarcophagidae
Articles created by Qbugbot
Insects described in 1824
Taxa named by Johann Wilhelm Meigen